In the run-up to the 2022 Latvian parliamentary election, various organisations carried out opinion polling to gauge voting intentions in Latvia. Results of such polls are displayed in this list.

The date range for these opinion polls are from the 2018 Latvian parliamentary election, held on 6 October, to the present day. The next election was be held on 1 October 2022. Poll results are listed in the table below in reverse chronological order, showing the most recent first.

Opinion polls

Graphical summary

Vote share 
The following are opinion polls conducted for the parliamentary election, measuring the estimated percentage of the vote. Parties in bold successfully pass the 5% electoral threshold to win seats in the Saeima, and the highlighted party is in the lead.

Turnout

See also 
Kariņš cabinet § Opinion polling

References 

Opinion polling in Latvia